Düzce is an electoral district of the Grand National Assembly of Turkey. It elects three members of parliament (deputies) to represent the province of the same name for a four-year term by the D'Hondt method, a party-list proportional representation system.

Members 
Population reviews of each electoral district are conducted before each general election, which can lead to certain districts being granted a smaller or greater number of parliamentary seats.

Düzce is the newest electoral district in Turkey, with the province being formed in November 1999 and electing its first Members of Parliament in the 2002 general election. Previously, it was part of the Bolu electoral district. It has only returned AK Party MPs since its creation.

General elections

June 2015

2011

Presidential elections

2014

References 

Electoral districts of Turkey
Politics of Düzce Province